Louisville is an unincorporated community in Lincoln County, in the U.S. state of Missouri.

History
Louisville was platted in 1832, and most likely was named after Louisville, Kentucky. A post office called Louisville was established in 1834, and remained in operation until 1913.

References

Unincorporated communities in Lincoln County, Missouri
Unincorporated communities in Missouri